The Deutz Suspension Bridge was a self-anchored suspension bridge using eyebar chains, located across the Rhine at Deutz in Cologne, Germany. It was built from 1913 to 1915. In 1935, it was named Hindenburg Bridge after Germany's second President died the previous year. It collapsed on 28 February 1945 during repair works and was replaced in 1948 by the world's first steel box girder bridge designed by Fritz Leonhardt and Gerd Lohmer. H. D. Robinson, who later worked with David B. Steinman on the Florianopolis Bridge, another eyebar chain bridge, consulted on the towers for the design of this Cologne bridge. It reportedly later served as inspiration for American bridge engineers and was specifically cited as a design influence on the Three Sisters bridges in Pittsburgh, Pennsylvania as well as for the Kiyosu Bridge on the Sumida River in Tokyo.

Statistics

span lengths 	92 m – 185 m – 92 m
deck width 	18.7 m / 27.50 m

External links
 
 Deutzer entry at "Bridges of Koeln"
HAER report on Three Sisters mentions H. D. Robinson involvement in the tower design of this bridge.

Suspension bridges in Germany
Self-anchored suspension bridges
Bridges completed in 1915
Chain bridges
Buildings and structures in Cologne